Władysław Ciastoń (16 December 1924 – 4 June 2021) was a Polish state official. A member of the Polish Workers' Party (PPR) and Polish United Workers' Party (PZPR), he served as Major General of Milicja Obywatelska and Deputy Minister of Internal Affairs. He also worked for the Ministry of Public Security and was Ambassador of Poland to Albania.

Biography
Ciastoń was acting head of the Ministry of Public Security in Wrocław and Bolesławiec from 1947 to 1949. From 1959 to 1971, he worked in the mathematical department at the Polish Academy of Sciences. He was Director of the Security Service from 1981 to 1987 and was Deputy Minister of Internal Affairs from 1981 to 1987. In 1983, he was appointed Major General of Milicja Obywatelska.

In 1984, Ciastoń was a suspect in the murder of Father Jerzy Popiełuszko. He was arrested on 8 December 1984, but was acquitted thanks to intervention from the communist regime. Following the end of his ministerial term, he served as Ambassador of Poland in Tirana from 1987 to 1990. He was acquitted for lack of evidence in 1994.

In 2019, Ciastoń was charged with suppressing the opposition in 1982 by unlawfully drafting them into the military. He was sentenced to two years in prison.

Władysław Ciastoń died in Warsaw on 4 June 2021 at the age of 96. On 14 June, he was buried at the Powązki Military Cemetery.

References

1924 births
2021 deaths
Polish diplomats
Polish politicians
Polish communists
Diplomats of the Polish People's Republic
Ambassadors of Poland to Albania
Polish Workers' Party politicians
Polish United Workers' Party members
People from Kraków